Cabrini University is a private Roman Catholic university in Radnor Township, Pennsylvania. It was founded by the Missionary Sisters of the Sacred Heart of Jesus in 1957, and was named after the first American naturalized citizen saint, Mother Frances Cabrini. It was one of the first universities in the United States to make community service a graduation requirement for all undergraduates; it now has a core curriculum centered on social justice which includes their signature classes, Engagements in the Common Good, also known as ECG.

History

Pre-History
The site of the original Cabrini College was originally the estate of John Thompson Dorrance, inventor of the process of making condensed soup and president of the Campbell Soup Company.  It was known as Woodcrest.  Dorrance owned a stable with many horses, had social events within the main hall of his mansion, and also had personal servants. The property was purchased by the Missionary Sisters of the Sacred Heart of Jesus (MSC) in 1953. It was first named "Villa Cabrini" after the organization's namesake, Saint Frances Xavier Cabrini. At first, Villa Cabrini was an orphanage.

Founding and growth
In 1957, Sister Ursula Infante established a school in the villa. Upon opening, it was a female-only school of only thirty-seven students. The orphanage was still a part of the community and they shared the use of the buildings.

The first graduating class was in 1961. Also around this same time period, Cabrini was awarded full accreditation by the Middle States Association.

In the 1950s, Cabrini was only made up of a few buildings. The mansion of the college was the central point of the college, housing the students, providing a cafeteria, classrooms, library, and a chapel. In 1958, they converted the stable house, now known as Grace Hall, to include both classrooms and dormitories.

In 1960, Cabrini finished construction on the Sacred Heart Hall (now known as Founder's Hall), which was a library, cafeteria, gymnasium, and even held science laboratories. The 1960s also saw the construction of a chapel in 1961 and a library in 1965.

Late 1960s and early 70s
The early 1970s were a time of much change for the college. After Infante's ten-year presidency in 1967, three presidents were to follow in only three years. Barbara Leonardo was president from 1967 to 1968. During her time at the college, she was also a dean and taught history. In 1968, Gervase Lapadula became president, but soon had to resign due to health problems.

From 1969 to 1973, Regina Casey was president of Cabrini College.  During her presidency, the college was starting to change from a girls-only to a co-educational establishment. Through a program with Eastern University, located next to the college, males started to attend classes at Cabrini. In turn, Cabrini students were offered more courses through both expansion and external courses at Eastern.

Mary Louise Sullivan: 1972–82
Even more changes took place between 1972 and 1982. Most importantly, the school became completely coeducational.

Eileen Currie, MSC '66: 1982–92 
During Currie's presidency, political science, social work, and computer science programs were added and Xavier Hall, a 124-student residence hall, was built. The faculty voted to make community service a requirement for all students; and Cabrini was recognized as one of the first colleges in the country, and the first in Pennsylvania, to integrate community service into its core curriculum.

Antoinette "Toni" Iadarola, Ph.D.: 1992–2008 
Toni Iadarola was the first lay president of Cabrini College. During her tenure, undergraduate enrollment increased from 732 to 1,700 and the number of resident students tripled. New and renovated buildings in this time included the Dixon Center, Founder's Hall, and the Center for Science, Education, and Technology (now the Antoinette Iadarola Center for Science, Education, and Technology).

Marie Angelella George: 2008–2013
Cabrini College garnered national attention when, in the midst of a national economic recession, it announced a tuition reduction of nearly 13%.

Donald B. Taylor: 2014–2022 
Don Taylor became Cabrini College's first male president on July 1, 2014. During his inaugural address on October 25, 2014, Taylor introduced the Cabrini 2020 Roadmap to Growth. This plan is a means to measure the college's progress, as it makes promises that were to have occurred by 2020. The initiative promises to have 100 percent of undergraduate students participating in a Living & Learning Community, pledges all undergraduate students will experience two or more High-Impact Coeducational Practices in their first year, and denotes a commitment to ensuring all students encounter at least four High-Impact practices before they are graduated by the college.

Under Taylor's leadership, Cabrini College changed its name to Cabrini University on July 1, 2016.

Helen G. Drinan (interim): 2022-present
The university experienced significant financial troubles beginning in the middle of the 2010s. In 2022, The Philadelphia Inquirer reported that the university faced a debt of 5 or 6 million dollars with a total budget of 45 million dollars. Enrollment had dropped to about 1,500 students from 2,360 in the 2016-2017 academic year. In response to these challenges, the university had repeatedly eliminated staff and restructured; for example, it eliminated the position of provost and reduced the number of colleges from three to two.

Academics

Cabrini University offers 40 undergraduate majors, additional minors, and specialized tracks. The institution also offers part-time graduate degrees in accounting, biological sciences, data science, education, and leadership. In 2016, it started two new part-time doctoral programs for working professionals: EdD in Educational Leadership and PhD in Organizational Development.

Faculty 
The university's faculty includes 33% full-time professors. 67% of the faculty members are adjunct professors (part-time), well above the nation's average.

The core curriculum: Justice Matters
All undergraduate students participate in the university's core curriculum, Justice Matters, in which, the university asserts, "students learn skills that will advance their careers and that can be used for the benefit of their communities, linking theory to practice in the world, preparing them for professional careers through a rigorous liberal learning experience."
The curriculum drives to raise awareness of social problems, involve students hands-on in social justice issues, to teach students to see themselves as participating in value-driven decision making, and to develop liberally educated persons.

Community service requirement
Cabrini University was one of the first universities in the United States to make community service a graduation requirement for all undergraduates.

Rankings
Cabrini is ranked 122nd in the Regional Universities (North) category by U.S. News & World Report for 2018.

Student life

Radio Station: WYBF-FM
Cabrini University has its own student-run variety radio station.

School newspaper: The Loquitur
The Loquitur has been the student-run newspaper of Cabrini University since 1959. The paper is now printed on a monthly basis, featuring on and off campus news, lifestyles, sports and perspective pieces. The Loquitur is celebrating its 60th anniversary during the 2018–19 academic year.

Woodcrest (Magazine/Literary Journal)
Woodcrest serves as the literary journal at Cabrini University. The magazine has seen many forms over the decades, and has been online since 2010. Advised by faculty and edited by students from the Department of Writing and Narrative Arts, Woodcrest is a national publication with roots in the literary arts. Faculty advisors have included editors and writers such as Seth Frechie, Amy Persichetti, and Bret Shepard.

Athletics
Cabrini University has 19 varsity teams and various recreational sports clubs.  The teams compete in the NCAA Division III, ECAC and the Atlantic East Conference (AEC). Cabrini is known for their men's lacrosse team which won the NCAA Division III National Championship in 2019 against Amherst College at Lincoln Financial Field.

References

External links
Official website
Official athletics website

 
Radnor Township, Delaware County, Pennsylvania
Catholic universities and colleges in Pennsylvania
Educational institutions established in 1957
Universities and colleges in Delaware County, Pennsylvania
1957 establishments in Pennsylvania
Former women's universities and colleges in the United States
Association of Catholic Colleges and Universities